Ghassan Khatib (1954- ) is a Palestinian politician. He was born in Nablus, in the West Bank, and is a member of the Palestinian People's Party. Khatib is married with three children. He was also a member of the Madrid Peace Delegation in 1991 and was involved in the Washington negotiations from 1991 to 1993. He was appointed the Palestinian National Authority Minister of Labor in 2002, then the Planning Minister in 2005-06. He is currently Director of the Government Media Centre.

Biography
Khatib holds a PhD in Middle East politics from Durham University. He is lecturer of Contemporary Arab Studies and International Studies at Birzeit University. He has served as Director of Government Media Center in 2009-2012 and Palestinian Minister of Labor 2002-2004 and Minister of Planning 200-2006. Khatib was Vice-President for community outreach in 2006-2009, and vice president for Advancement in 2012-2016 at Birzeit University.  He was Founder and director of the Jerusalem Media & Communication Centre, which specializes in research, opinion polling and media activities. He was a member of the Palestinian delegation for the Madrid Middle East Peace Conference in 1991 and the subsequent bilateral Palestinian-Israeli negotiations in Washington from 1991-93. Khatib was co-founded and co-directed bitterlemons.org, a Palestinian-Israeli internet-based political magazine. He was member of the Joint Working Group on Israel-Palestine Relations at Weatherhead Center for International Affairs at Harvard University.

Work
 Palestinian Politics and the Middle East Peace Process: consensus and competition in the Palestinian negotiation team. London: Routledge, 2010.

References

1954 births
Living people
People from Nablus
Palestinian People's Party politicians
Government ministers of the Palestinian National Authority
Alumni of Durham University